Richard Albert DiCostanzo (born January 10, 1908) was an American lawyer and politician from New York.

Life
He was born on January 10, 1908, in Manhattan, the son of Angelo DiCostanzo and Modestina (Ferrante) DiCostanzo. He graduated from DeWitt Clinton High School in 1926; B.S. from New York University College of Arts and Science in 1929; and J.D. from New York University School of Law.

DiCostanzo was a member of the New York State Senate from 1943 to 1946, sitting in the 164th and 165th New York State Legislatures.

Sources

1908 births
Year of death missing
People from Manhattan
Republican Party New York (state) state senators
DeWitt Clinton High School alumni
New York University School of Law alumni